Legislative elections were held in Mexico on 5 July 2009. Voters elected 500 new deputies (300 by their respective constituencies, 200 by proportional representation) to sit in the Chamber of Deputies for the 61st Congress.

Opinion polls
Opinion polling, by pollster Demotecnia, that was taken less than a month before the election showed the Institutional Revolutionary Party with 36%, the National Action Party with 31%, and the Party of the Democratic Revolution with 16%.

Voto en blanco
A none of the above movement, dubbed "voto en blanco", or "blank vote", had arisen in response to the perceived corruption of the three major parties running in this election. Starting as a small group on blogs and YouTube, the movement had expanded its ranks, with politicians and intellectuals, such as Jose Antonio Crespo, supporting the movement. Pollster Demotecnia showed that 3% of the people would be willing to boycott the elections in response to the "voto en blanco" movement.

Opposition to the movement came from organizations such as the Federal Electoral Institute, a government institute who seeks to expand voter participation, who claimed that the response to an unsatisfactory democracy is not to have fewer people vote but to have more people involved in the electoral process.

Results

References

Mexico
Legislative election
Legislative elections in Mexico
July 2009 events in Mexico